Mahdi S. Hantush (1921–1984) was a prominent Iraqi-born American hydrologist known for his analytical work on leaky aquifers and well hydraulics. He was the founder of the New Mexico Tech Hydrology Program. His granddaughter is Yasmin Younis, the 2018 Student Commencement Speaker at Boston University’s 185th Commencement, which went viral all over the Middle East.

Academic
Mahdi Hantush earned his first degree as a civil engineer from American University In Beirut, Lebanon. He then moved to the United States, where he obtained an MSc. in Irrigation Engineering at UC Berkeley in 1947. He followed this up with a doctorate in civil engineering at the University of Utah under C.E. Jacob.
In 1954 Hantush received a call to the New Mexico Institute of Mining and Technology where he developed one of the first graduate programs in Groundwater Hydrology. He headed the New Mexico Tech Hydrology Program for over a decade, during which time it attracted students from all over the world.

Professional
As a civil engineer, Hantush began his professional career as an irrigation engineer in Iraq. This work provided him with practical experience and an appreciation for the problems involved in the development and management of water resources.

Honors and awards
O.E. Meinzer Award, 1968
New Mexico Tech has honored his memory by creating the "Mahdi Hantush Memorial Fellowship"

See also

Well test
New Mexico Tech
Meinzer Award

References
http://www.ees.nmt.edu/hantush/

Iraqi hydrologists
1921 births
1984 deaths
New Mexico Institute of Mining and Technology faculty
Iraqi expatriates in Lebanon
American University of Beirut alumni
University of California, Berkeley alumni
Iraqi emigrants to the United States